Mount Toro is a mountain peak in the Santa Lucia range in Monterey County, California. It is located within the boundaries of Los Padres National Forest. The name comes from the word "Toro," which in Spanish means "Bull".

There are about 16 people per square kilometer around Mount Toro. The land around Mount Toro is mountainous. The area around Mount Toro is covered with dirt and mud.

Mount Toro is a place Monterey County residents’ hike to the top to take advantage of the snow and views during the winter months. It is a five-mile hike from Dorrance Ranch. Sleds and toboggans can be taken down Toro's slopes. For some, it can be the first opportunity to see and feel real snow. Magnificent views can be seen of the entire shoreline of Monterey Bay, the Corral de Tierra basin, Monterey, Watsonville, Castroville, Salinas, Santa Rita, Natividad, Chualar, Gonzales, and Soledad with the naked eye. Using a telescope you can see Lick Observatory on Mt. Hamilton, and Mount Diablo and the snow-covered Sierras  eastward.

The Monterey County Superintendent of Schools began building a network of K31OL-D translators in the early 1960s to rebroadcast public television from KQED in San Francisco, with the first, channel 72 from Mount Toro, going on air in September 1964.

The land has oak savannas, ponds, wetlands, and grasslands, habitat for golden eagle, California red-legged frog, California tiger salamander, burrowing owl, and California condor.

The ranch was originally part of Rancho Tularcitos.

Mount Toro is one of Monterey County's most familiar vistas. John Steinbeck characterized Carmel Valley as "Pastures of Heaven.”

The River Fire was a wildfire that broke out from a lightning storm early on August 16, 2020, in Monterey County, south of Salinas, near River Road and Mount Toro.

Climate 

The climate is Mediterranean. The average temperature is  °C. The warmest month is July, at  °C, and the coldest is February, at  °C. The average rainfall is  millimeters per year. The wettest month is December, with  millimeters of rain, and the driest is May, with  millimeters.

See also
 List of highest points in California by county

References

External links 
 

Mountains of Monterey County, California
Carmel Valley, California
Santa Lucia Range
Monterey Ranger District, Los Padres National Forest
Mountains of Northern California
Big Sur
Junípero Serra